The Telephone Preference Service (TPS) is a UK register of domestic telephone numbers whose users have indicated that they do not wish to receive sales and marketing telephone calls. Registration is free of charge. The service is paid for by the direct marketing industry. There is a similar service for corporate users, the Corporate Telephone Preference Service (CTPS). Similar do not call lists are implemented in other countries.

It is a legal requirement that all organisations (including companies, charities, voluntary organisations and political parties) do not make such calls to numbers registered on the TPS unless consent has been given; however the TPS has no powers of enforcement, and a 2013 survey by the consumer association Which? found that people registered on the TPS list received twice as many marketing calls as those not on the list. Enforcement is the responsibility of the Information Commissioner, which until 2012 did not have suitable legal powers to act, but in 2012 acquired the power to impose fines of up to £500,000.

The TPS is the only such register that is enforced by law in the UK. It is regulated by Ofcom and enforced by the Information Commissioner's Office (ICO). It is run by the Direct Marketing Association (DMA), the organisation grouping telemarketers, on behalf of Ofcom; neither Ofcom nor the government provide any funding.

Exemptions include people who have, often unwittingly, consented to be contacted, and calls purporting to be for market research.

The effectiveness of the TPS is limited. Enforcement is so lax that many organisations completely ignore it and do not check numbers. There is no control over calls from outside the UK; many of the most abusive and sometimes fraudulent calls originate from overseas. A spokesman for the Direct Marketing Association—who run the TPS—said in July 2012 that it had received a dramatic increase in complaints from telephone subscribers cold-called by telemarketing firms, and that some firms simply chose to ignore the rules. The DMA sent between 1,000-2,000 complaints to the Information Commissioner's Office each month, yet no penalty fines had been imposed in at least 18 months.

The head of the TPS said candidly about the service's failings, in a 2013 interview "I would completely understand if the Guardian [newspaper] wrote a 'TPS is broken' headline" 

The similarly named Government Telephone Preference Scheme is quite different; it is a system used since 1952 by the General Post Office and its successor British Telecom for disabling outgoing calls from all landlines if the telephone network is overloaded during an emergency; only vital lines which are registered with the scheme may make outgoing calls when it is activated.

History 
Residential users have been able to register on the list since May 1999 under the Telecommunications (Data Protection and Privacy) Regulations 1999. The list has statutory force under the Privacy and Electronic Communications (EC Directive) Regulations 2003. From 25 June 2004 corporate subscribers were also allowed to register on the list under Privacy and Electronic Communications (EC Directive) (Amendment) Regulations 2004. In 2012 the enforcement powers of the ICO and penalties were much strengthened; however in 2013 it was still described as "no longer fit for purpose", and its head said "there is legislation to back us up. But the rules are complex, have loopholes, are split between agencies, tend to lag technology advances, and have been low priority".

Registration and complaints
Numbers can be registered via the TPS website, or by telephone, and can take up to 28 days to become fully effective. Complaints can be made via the site. The TPS says that it "will then contact the company and warn them they are breaching the regulations and ask them to add your number to their own Do Not Call list."

Violations 
In addition to fines, the ICO publishes details of any formal action it takes against organisations on its website and in press releases. However,  no penalties had been applied in 18 months, despite 1,000 to 2,000 monthly complaints. In 2014 consumer organisation Which? found that TPS registration eliminated no more than a third of unwanted calls, failing particularly with calls from overseas call centres.

Companies claiming to offer call banning
The TPS website publishes a list of  "unregulated organisations" that offer a paid-for telemarketing call banning service; the site says that:  "our advice is NOT to pay them".  TPS lists the websites of many such organisations, many of which display advertising links on Google searches that may mislead and divert those searching for the TPS website. However, the TPS is free of charge and is the only service that calling companies are required by law to comply with, is regulated by Ofcom, and is enforced by the Information Commissioners Office (ICO). Some such organisations offer their services on Internet Web sites; others phone, often actually from overseas though this is not stated, sometimes saying falsely that the recipient has given permission to call, and often falsely claim to be from or affiliated with the TPS or BT. Many, but not all, services offered are fraudulent in addition to being ineffective.

Unwanted calls not covered by TPS

Calls with consent
Telephone subscribers who have at some time consented to be called—perhaps by filling in a long-forgotten Web form years ago with a box to tick "if you don't want to receive further information", or a firm of which the subscriber is a customer—may legally be called unless they explicitly withdraw the implied permission given to the organisation concerned. A ticked box—or an unticked "no" box—on a form from a trusted organisation agreeing to permit calls from "other carefully selected organisations" can allow a huge variety of calls.

Silent calls
Silent calls, calls which remain silent when answered, are often due to callers using an automated dialer to make multiple calls in rapid succession, anticipating that many will not be answered; if an operator is not available at the time a call is answered, it will be silent. Silent calls, while not covered by TPS, can be reported to Ofcom.

Automatic messages
Organisations that use recorded phone messages (robocalls) for marketing or sales calls must have prior consent from the subscriber. Unauthorised silent calls and robocalls from an identified caller can be reported to the ICO.

Market research
TPS does not cover market research calls; instead individual MR companies must be contacted and told not to call a number. If the company continues to call, complaints can be made to the Market Research Society, who may be able to take action if the call was from one of their members. The TPS rules are intended to allow legitimate opinion pollers such as ICM, asking about political and other preferences, but sales lead harvesters claim to be "conducting a survey", and try to collect personal information—age, income, interests—that can be used for later sales calls or sold, rather than anonymous views about government, or council exercise facilities.

Calls from overseas
TPS will investigate unsolicited direct marketing calls from overseas made on behalf of a company that has a UK presence. Complaints about calls from companies with no UK presence can be made to the ICO. The ICO co-operates with similar organisations in Europe, the European Commission and other countries. UK organisations cannot themselves regulate or prevent calls to UK numbers being made from overseas.

Debt collection
Organisations looking to recover debts are not required to screen their data against the TPS register. Such calls, in cases where they are not allowed, can be reported to the local Trading Standards Office. Debt collection callers to a number for someone not at that number can be told not to call again; if they continue to call, the ICO may be able to help from a data protection perspective.

Text messages
Text (SMS) messages are not covered by TPS. However, they can only be sent with the recipient's prior consent; complaints can be made to the ICO.

Text alerts
Text messages sent to a landline not able to display them can cause the telephone to ring several times, and the text message to be read out automatically if the phone is answered.

Fraudulent calls
Registration with TPS does not stop illegal fraudulent calls in practice, which are often from overseas; and sometimes generated through Caller ID spoofing to display a telephone number different from the original one. Although the TPS does not have the authority to take any action of enforcement, they regularly send updates about the incoming complaints to the ICO as the body responsible. This strongly supports their investigations. Such calls can also be reported to the local Trading Standards Office or the police.

See also 
 Do not call list
 Robinson list
 Canadian Do Not Call List
 New Zealand Name Removal Service
 United States National Do Not Call Registry

References

External links 
 
 Information Commissioner's Office
 Ofcom
 TPS Screening made easy
 TPS Screening for businesses
 Outbound Call Center (in German)

History of telecommunications in the United Kingdom
Telemarketing